Goat Haunt Mountain is located in the Lewis Range, Glacier National Park in the U.S. state of Montana. The stagnant Miche Wabun Glacier is located on the eastern slopes of the mountain. Goat Haunt Lake is northwest of the peak.

See also
 Mountains and mountain ranges of Glacier National Park (U.S.)

References

Goat Haunt Mountain
Mountains of Glacier National Park (U.S.)
Lewis Range
Mountains of Montana